Shenkman is a surname. Notable people with the surname include:

Belle Shenkman (1928–1995), Canadian arts patron
Ben Shenkman (born 1968), American actor